Louise Karlsson (born 26 April 1974) is a former Swedish breaststroke and medley swimmer who competed in the 1992 and 1996 Summer Olympics. She finished 8th on 200 m medley in the 1996 Summer Olympics. She also held the world record on 100 m medley for about one year, with the time 1:01.03 in January 1997.

Clubs
Skärets SS
Helsingborgs SS

References

1974 births
Swedish female breaststroke swimmers
Swedish female medley swimmers
Swedish female butterfly swimmers
Olympic swimmers of Sweden
Swimmers at the 1992 Summer Olympics
Swimmers at the 1996 Summer Olympics
Living people
World record setters in swimming
Swedish female freestyle swimmers
Medalists at the FINA World Swimming Championships (25 m)
European Aquatics Championships medalists in swimming
20th-century Swedish women